Mohammad Hasanlu (also Romanized as Moḩammad Ḩasanlū; also known as Moḩammad Ḩasanī) is a village in Mulan Rural District, in the Central District of Kaleybar County, East Azerbaijan Province, Iran. At the 2006 census, its population was 120, in 23 families.

References 

Populated places in Kaleybar County